The 1981–82 season was Newport County's second consecutive season in the Third Division and their 54th season overall in the Football League.

Season review

Results summary 
Note: Three points for a win

Results by round

Fixtures and results

Third Division

FA Cup

Football League Cup

Welsh Cup

League table

External links
 Newport County 1981-1982 : Results
 Newport County football club match record: 1982
 WELSH CUP 1981/82

1981-82
English football clubs 1981–82 season
Welsh football clubs 1981–82 season